Yuri Aleksandrovich Chaplygin, a full member of the Russian Academy of Sciences, is the president of the National Research University of Electronic Technology, Doctor of Engineering Science.

Born on July 12, 1951 in Kursk. Studied at MIET (1968–1974), graduated with honors.

1974-1983 – postgraduate, engineer, junior scientist, assistant at the chair of General Physics at National Research University of Electronic Technology

1984-1987 – assistant vice-rector for research.

1987-1988 – partkom secretary.

1988-1998 – vice-rector for research at MIET.

In October 1998 was elected MIET rector, in June 2016 was elected MIET president.

A scholar in physics, integrated-circuits, sensors, microsystem technology and nanotechnology. Has more than 150 scientific publications. Scientific adviser of 2 Doctors of Sciences and 5 PhDs.

Laureate of Russian Federation Government Prize in science and technology (twice); received an Order of Honor, Order of Friendship and several medals.

External links
 
 Biography on MIET site 

Living people
Full Members of the Russian Academy of Sciences
1951 births
Rectors of universities in Russia